The Panther Seep Formation is a geologic formation found in the mountain ranges of south-central New Mexico. It preserves fossils dating back to the late Pennsylvanian to early Permian.

Description
The formation is highly variable in lithology, consisting of interbedded black to reddish sandy, silty, or calcareous shale; brown to olive calcareous siltstone, brown to gray calcareous arkosic sandstone; gypsum; and gray argillaceous to silty limestone. It overlies the Lead Camp Limestone or Bishop Cap Formation and is overlain by the Hueco Group.

The unit likely correlates with Bar B Formation in the Caballo Mountains and the Holder Formation in the Sacramento Mountains.

Fossils
The formation includes patch reefs and numerous fusulinids of Virgilian (Gzhelian) age. The formation also contains algae and some invertebrate fossils typical of the Virgilian. The lower beds may be Missourian (Kasimovian) in age while the uppermost beds may be Wolfcampian (Cisuralian) in age.

History of investigation
The formation was first defined by F.E. Kottlowski and coinvestigators in 1956, who divided it into informal upper and lower members.

See also

 List of fossiliferous stratigraphic units in New Mexico
 Paleontology in New Mexico

Footnotes

References
 
 
 

Carboniferous formations of New Mexico
Carboniferous southern paleotropical deposits